James Milton Sessions (September 20, 1882 - November 14, 1962) was an American artist born in Rome, NY who received his first exposure to art from his mother, herself an accomplished artist. He trained at the Art Institute of Chicago from 1903–1906 and initially supported himself as a wheelsman aboard Great Lakes ships from 1906–1914, later serving in the Illinois Naval Reserve during World War I. He also worked as a commercial illustrator.

Sessions was a master watercolorist of marine, sporting, and military World War II scenes. He developed a love of the sea and is probably best known as a painter of marine subjects. Sessions painted images of numerous locations, from the Bahamas to New England's busy fishing harbors, north to the raw fishing grounds of Nova Scotia, and ultimately to the Navajo reservations in New Mexico.

Some of his works documented important World War II events. They visually portray and convey the spirit of the American fighting forces in both the Pacific and European campaigns, commencing with the bombing of Pearl Harbor, followed by D-Day Europe through to the final phases of the Pacific war, such as Jimmy Doolittle's daylight bombing raids of the Japanese mainland to the unconditional surrender of the Japanese military. The Chicago Tribune newspaper utilized his talents. Sessions is considered to be the greatest "brush reporter" of World War II. His works can be found in Presidential collections, numerous important corporate collections and military establishments throughout the country.

Sessions created numerous wartime advertisements. Examples are a 1943 Willys Jeep ad showing the Coast Guard at Guadalcanal, and a Borg-Warner ad in 1945 showing the mass production of radiators and clutches for motorized warfare manufactured in Detroit. His work is highly collectible in the field of Militaria/WWII/1939-1945.

In 1962 the New York Graphic Society commissioned him to make four paintings, reproductions of which were distributed as part of the Society's Works of Masters Group. Many of his other paintings have been reproduced over the years, issued as posters and as high quality reprints on watercolor paper.

Sessions was married in Chicago, Illinois in 1946 to Chrysanthy G. Deamanthopulos. Although very prolific in the style of John Whorf and Ogden Pleissner, he unfortunately destroyed much of his own work. He died on November 14, 1962 in Chicago at the age of 80.

His work has been exhibited or collected at the Metropolitan Museum of Art in New York City, the Art Institute of Chicago, the Museum of Fine Art, Milwaukee, and the Museum of Fine Art, Cleveland.

1882 births
1962 deaths
People from Rome, New York
American watercolorists
20th-century American painters
American male painters
20th-century American male artists